The Mexico national rugby sevens team participates in competitions such as the World Sevens Series and Rugby World Cup Sevens. Mexico finished in last place in the 2008 USA Sevens and finished sixth in the 2011 Pan American Games and eighth in the 2015 Pan American Games.

History

Mexico participated in the June 2015 NACRA Sevens, a qualifying tournament for the 2016 Summer Olympics. Mexico went 2-1 in pool play, finishing second in the group and qualifying for the semifinals.

In June 2015, Mexico and Cayman Island qualified to the Hong Kong Sevens 2016 World Series Qualifier at the NACRA Sevens, finishing 3rd and 4th respectively.

Players

Current squad
Squad at 2021 Canada Sevens: 

 Ricardo Ancira
 Raúl Barrón
 Enrique Carmona
 Nicolás Falcón
 Patricio Falcón
 Omar García
 Tobias Hernández
 José Lárraga
 Luc Martín
 Fernando Mendoza
 Alejandro Revilla
 José Luis Velasco
 Joseph Villalobos

Tournament History

Olympic qualifying

World Rugby Sevens Series

Pan American Games

Central American and Caribbean Games

RAN Sevens

See also
 World Sevens Series
 Rugby World Cup Sevens
 Mexico national rugby union team

References

National rugby sevens teams
Mexico national rugby union team
Rugby union in Mexico